The 2012 American Handball Women's Youth Championships took place in Santiago from May 8 – 12. It acts as the Pan American qualifying tournament for the 2012 Women's Youth World Handball Championship.

Results

Final standing

Best team
Goalkeeper:  Erica Vallée
Right wing:  Rocio Squizziato
Right back:  Daniela Miño
Central back:  Alejandra Scarrone
Left back:  Isabelle Dos Santos
Left wing:  Martina Barreiro
Pivot:  Nadyne Keller

References 
 brasilhandebol.com.br

2012 in handball
Pan American Women's Youth Handball Championship
2012 in youth sport